Sheikh Mohammed bin Thani (c. 1788 – 18 December 1878), also known as Mohammed bin Thani bin Mohammed Al Thamir, was the first Hakim (ruler) of the whole Qatari Peninsula, following his predecessor, his father, tribal leader Sheikh Thani bin Mohammed Al Thamir. He is known for being the father of Sheikh Jassim bin Mohammed Al Thani, the founder of Qatar and who fended off the Ottoman army in the late 19th century.

Early life and governance

Sheikh Mohammed bin Thani was born in Fuwayrit, Qatar, by his father and predecessor to the throne, Sheikh Thani bin Mohammed Al Thamir (born in Zubarah), with Sheikh Mohammed being the second eldest son of his father, along with his four siblings:

 Sheikh Thamir bin Thani bin Mohammed Al Thamir
 Sheikh Eid bin Thani bin Mohammed Al Thamir
 Sheikh Ali bin Thani bin Mohammed Al Thamir
 Sheikh Ahmad bin Thani bin Mohammed Al-Thamir

After living a lengthy life in Fuwayrit, the Al Thani family finally moved in 1847 from Fuwayrit to Doha, the capital city and state of Qatar, under the leadership of Sheikh Mohammed, who was 59 at the time.

His father later died in 1860, when he succeeded to the throne. By the early 1860s, Sheikh Mohammed emerged as the most important figure in Qatar and an important government official in the Persian Gulf. He abdicated, due to old age, as emir of Qatar in 1876, turning the throne over to his eldest son Sheikh Jassim bin Mohammed Al Thani.

Events during his reign

 Sheikh Mohammed extended his influence throughout the whole Qatari Peninsula and strengthened his position externally by making an alliance with Faisal Bin Turki, the emir of the second Saudi state, who himself paid a visit to Qatar in early 1851.
 On 12 September 1868, Sheikh Mohammed signed a treaty with Colonel Lewis Pelly, a British resident in the Persian Gulf, which recognized the independence of Qatar.
 In 1871, Sheikh Mohammed made a plea for protection against any external attack to the Ottomans at Al Hasa. However, the Ottomans were the ones who displayed hostility to the Qataris in the same decade of his plea.

Children
Sheikh Mohammed had 8 children: six sons (listed below) and two daughters, both with unknown names.

Death

Sheikh Mohammed died two years after abdicating from his throne in 1876. He died a natural death on 18 December 1878. As remembrance, it is a national day in Qatar.

References

External links
Shaikh Mohammed Bin Thani :: Amiri Diwan
Al Thani Tree, offered in Arabic
Official Page in Al Thani Tree, offered in Arabic

Emirs of Qatar
Mohammed
1788 births
1878 deaths
Qatari Muslims
19th-century Arabs